Bromadiolone is a potent anticoagulant rodenticide. It is a second-generation 4-hydroxycoumarin derivative and vitamin K antagonist, often called a "super-warfarin" for its added potency and tendency to accumulate in the liver of the poisoned organism. When first introduced to the UK market in 1980, it was effective against rodent populations that had become resistant to first generation anticoagulants. 

The product may be used both indoors and outdoors for rats and mice.

It is classified as an extremely hazardous substance in the United States as defined in Section 302 of the Emergency Planning and Community Right-to-Know Act (42 U.S.C. 11002), and is subject to strict reporting requirements by facilities which produce, store, or use it in significant quantities.

Toxicity 

Bromadiolone can be absorbed through the digestive tract, through the lungs, or through skin contact. The pesticide is generally given orally. The substance is a vitamin K antagonist. The lack of vitamin K in the circulatory system reduces blood clotting and will cause death due to internal hemorrhaging.

Poisoning does not show effects for 24 to 36 hours after it is eaten and can take up to 2–5 days to cause death.

Following are acute  values for various animals (mammals):

 rats 1.125 mg/kg b.w.
 mice 1.75 mg/kg b.w.
 rabbits 1 mg/kg b.w.
 dogs > 10 mg/kg b.w. (oral MTD)
 cats > 25 mg/kg b.w. (oral MTD)

Chemistry 
The compound is used as a mixture of four stereoisomers. Its two stereoisomeric centers are at the phenyl- and the hydroxyl-substituted carbons in the carbon chain of the substituent at the 3 position of the coumarin.

Antidote
Vitamin K1 is used as antidote.

See also
Brodifacoum

References 

Anticoagulant rodenticides
Bromoarenes
Chromones
Secondary alcohols
4-Hydroxycoumarins
Biphenyls